Wild Mouse is the name of a roller coaster at Idlewild and Soak Zone in Ligonier, Pennsylvania. It is the one of two coasters in the park, along with the small classic wooden Rollo Coaster, and its only steel roller coaster.

History
The Wild Mouse was originally designed for Wiener Prater in Vienna, Austria where it operated as Speedy Gonzalez from 1985-1987.  Built by Vekoma, it is thus far the only wild mouse coaster designed by this corporation. It was later moved to Alton Towers, an amusement park in Staffordshire, England. When it opened there in 1987, its  name was the Alton Mouse. The ride featured a covered lift hill there, which was used to conceal the treacherous curves at the top of the hill from patrons until they reached the top. The lift hill was also tilted, which suggests that the cover was a rotating tunnel, which with the tilting track, created the effect of going upside-down. The Alton Mouse was closed in 1992, partly because the harsh curve and braking system had diminished its popularity, but mainly because the area of the park it was located in was small and the ride was popular, causing congestion. Local residents also complained of the noise levels, so when the Alton Mouse was removed, so were the other rides in the area, which was closed off from the rest of the park.

In 1993, the Wild Mouse reopened at Idlewild. The track was originally painted a rust red with black supports when the ride first moved to Idlewild. Rough air brakes continued to hinder the ride until 2002, when a new, much smoother magnetic braking system was installed by Pribonics Technologies and the color scheme was changed to gray track, still with black supports.

The Wild Mouse features a traditional setup, including tight, unbanked curves and short but steep hills.  However, the ride's height is somewhat taller than that of the average wild mouse coaster and includes a somewhat rougher ride.

The ride did not operate at all during the 2012 season. However, the coaster was testing in early July 2013. On July 14, Wild Mouse ride reopened to the public.

Trivia
Wild Mouse is the only "Mouse" coaster ever built by Vekoma.

References

External links 
 Youtube video on-board Wild Mouse

Roller coasters in Pennsylvania
Roller coasters introduced in 1985
Roller coasters introduced in 1993
Wild Mouse roller coasters
1985 establishments in Pennsylvania